Stickball is a street game similar to baseball, usually formed as a pick-up game played in large cities in the Northeastern United States, especially New York City and Philadelphia. The equipment consists of a broom handle and a rubber ball, typically a spaldeen, pensy pinky, high bouncer or tennis ball. The rules come from baseball and are modified to fit the situation.  For example, a manhole cover may be used as a base, or buildings for foul lines. The game is a variation of stick and ball games dating back to at least the 1750s. This game was widely popular among youths during the 20th century until the 1980s.

Variants

In fungo, the batter tosses the ball into the air and hits it on the way down or after one or more bounces. Another variant is Vitilla, a popular variation of stickball played primarily in the Dominican Republic and areas in the United States with large Dominican populations.

Stickball in popular culture 

 In a scene from the 1976 movie Rocky, a group of youths play halfball (a variant of stickball) on the streets of Philadelphia. In the 1979 sequel Rocky II, the main character himself plays stickball/halfball in one scene. 
 The season 4 episode, "Lisa's First Word", of the animated series The Simpsons has a scene taking place in the Lower East Side of Springfield (visualized like a typical 1930s urban New York City neighborhood) where a boy says to his friends if they want to play stickball and they agree; instead of actually playing stickball, the group of kids head over to an arcade and play a video game of the sport.
 White Collar TV series (Episode 2.02 - "Need To Know") protagonist Neil Coffrey comes up with a clever plan to create a park in honor of the fictional boy Timmy Nolan, who loved to play the old-fashioned game of stickball.

 During the opening credits of Big starring Tom Hanks.

Films
Fast pitch Stick ball (An Unheard Pastime) (2007) Directed by Jesse Tornabe
Coverage Of Stick ball Opening Day (2008) 
Bragging Rights: Stick ball Stories (2006). Directed by Sonia Gonzalez.
Stick ball Night Coverage: Stick ball Highlights (2006). Directed by Ross O Fomerand.

See also

 Cork ball
 Gillidanda
 Half-rubber
 Vitilla
 Street cricket

References

Baseball genres
Sports originating in the United States
Street games
Team sports
Ball and bat games